The Lexton Plains Football League was an Australian rules football competition in western Victoria, Australia. The league ran an annual competition from 1999 to 2010.

History
The Western Plains FL was formed in 1930 and the Lexton FL was formed in 1945. In 1999, The Lexton Football League and the Western Plains Football League merged to form the Lexton Plains FL.

The league folded after the 2010 season, with the last grand final being postponed due to the flooding isolating clubs scheduled to play. Navarre, Natte-Bealiba and Lexton joined the Maryborough Castlemaine District Football League, the Ararat Eagles joined the Mininera & District Football League and the four other clubs joined the Central Highlands Football League in an 18 team Competition for 2011.

First Ladder 1999

Premiers
 1999 - Navarre
 2000 - Carngham-Linton
 2001 - Skipton
 2002 - Rokewood-Corindhap
 2003 - Skipton
 2004 - Carngham-Linton
 2005 - Skipton
 2006 - Carngham-Linton
 2007 - Carngham-Linton
 2008 - Carngham-Linton
 2009 - Skipton
 2010 - Skipton

2008 Ladder 
																			
																			
FINALS

2009 Ladder 
																			
																			
FINALS

2010 Ladder 
																			
																			
FINALS

Former Clubs
 Avoca
 Dunolly
 Landsborough
 Marnoo

External links
Lexton Plains FL website
Full Points Footy -Lexton Plains Football League

Defunct Australian rules football competitions in Victoria (Australia)
1999 establishments in Australia